Novastadio  is a sports talk and debate television program produced by Telenova and aired on various affiliated local television channels in Italy. The program is entirely devoted to Italian soccer, in particular the Serie A.

Commentators and Presenters

Actual commentators and presenters
Gianni Visnadi
Michele Marchetti
Luciano Rindone
Domenico Marocchino
Enzo Gambaro
Luigi Balestra
Bruno Pizzul
Alessio Grosso
Emiliano Mondonico
Bobo Gori
Luca Serafini
Piero Frosio
Carlo Coppola
Luisito Suárez
Sandro Mazzola
Luca Serafini

References

External links
Web site
Youtube
Twitter

Italian sports television series